Banda is an Austronesian language of the Central Maluku subgroup. Along with Kei, it is one of the two languages of the Kei Islands in the Indonesian province of Maluku.

Originally, the Banda language was spoken on the Banda Islands until the Dutch military campaign in 1621, during which almost all indigenous inhabitants were killed, enslaved or exiled. Survivors of the campaign found refuge on the island of Kei Besar, where the language is still in active use in the villages Banda Elat and Banda Eli.

References

Central Maluku languages
Languages of the Maluku Islands